The Lessico etimologico italiano (LEI) is an etymological dictionary of the Italian language.

It has been published since 1979 by the Akademie der Wissenschaften und der Literatur in Mainz, Germany under the direction of Max Pfister and Wolfgang Schweickard.

 1979. — Vol. 1. Lfg. 01. — 96 p.
 1980. — Vol. 1. Lfg. 02. — 96 p.
 1981. — Vol. 1. Lfg. 03. — 96 p.
 1982. — Vol. 1. Lfg. 04. — 96 p.
 1982. — Vol. 1. Lfg. 05. — 96 p.
 1982. — Vol. 1. Lfg. 06. — 96 p.
 1983. — Vol. 1. Lfg. 07. — 96 p.
 1984. — Vol. 1. Lfg. 08. — 96 p.
 1984. — Vol. 1. Ab—alburnus. — 780 p. — 
 1984. — Vol. 2. Lfg. 09. — 96 p.
 1984. — Vol. 2. Lfg. 10. — 96 p.
 1985. — Vol. 2. Lfg. 11. — 96 p.
 1985. — Vol. 2. Lfg. 12. — 96 p.
 1986. — Vol. 2. Lfg. 13. — 96 p.
 1986. — Vol. 2. Lfg. 14. — 96 p.
 1986. — Vol. 2. Lfg. 15. — 96 p.
 1987. — Vol. 2. Lfg. 16. — 96 p.
 1987. — Vol. 2. Lfg. 17. — 96 p.
 1987. — Vol. 2. albus—apertura. — 880 p. — 
 1987. — Vol. 3.1. Lfg. 18. — 96 p.
 1987. — Vol. 3.1. Lfg. 19. — 96 p.
 1987. — Vol. 3.1. Lfg. 20. — 96 p.
 1988. — Vol. 3.1. Lfg. 21. — 96 p.
 1988. — Vol. 3.1. Lfg. 22. — 96 p.
 1988. — Vol. 3.1. Lfg. 23. — 96 p.
 1988. — Vol. 3.1. Lfg. 24. — 96 p.
 1989. — Vol. 3.1. Lfg. 25. — 96 p.
 1989. — Vol. 3.1. Lfg. 26. — 96 p.
 1989. — Vol. 3.2. Lfg. 27. — 96 p.
 1989. — Vol. 3.2. Lfg. 28. — 96 p.
 1990. — Vol. 3.2. Lfg. 29. — 96 p.
 1990. — Vol. 3.2. Lfg. 30. — 96 p.
 1990. — Vol. 3.2. Lfg. 31. — 96 p.
 1991. — Vol. 3.2. Lfg. 32. — 96 p.
 1991. — Vol. 3.2. Lfg. 33. — 96 p.
 1991. — Vol. 3.2. Lfg. 34. — 96 p.
 1991. — Vol. 3.2. Lfg. 35. — 96 p.
 1992. — Vol. 3.2. Lfg. 36. — 96 p.
 1992. — Vol. 3.1. apertus—asthma. — 876 p. — 
 1992. — Vol. 3.2. aspergere—azumus. Indici. — 944 p. — .
 1992. — Vol. 4. Lfg. 37. — 96 p.
 1993. — Vol. 4. Lfg. 38. — 96 p.
 1993. — Vol. 4. Lfg. 39. — 96 p.
 1993. — Vol. 4. Lfg. 40. — 96 p.
 1993. — Vol. 4. Lfg. 41. — 96 p.
 1994. — Vol. 4. Lfg. 42. — 96 p.
 1994. — Vol. 4. Lfg. 43. — 96 p.
 1994. — Vol. 4. Lfg. 44. — 96 p.
 1994. — Vol. 4. Lfg. 45. — 96 p.
 1995. — Vol. 4. Lfg. 46. — 96 p.
 1994. — Vol. 4. ba—bassano. — 872 p. — 
 1995. — Vol. 5. Lfg. 47. — 96 p.
 1995. — Vol. 5. Lfg. 48. — 96 p.
 1995. — Vol. 5. Lfg. 49. — 96 p.
 1995. — Vol. 5. Lfg. 50. — 96 p.
 1996. — Vol. 5. Lfg. 51. — 96 p.
 1996. — Vol. 5. Lfg. 52. — 96 p.
 1996. — Vol. 5. Lfg. 53. — 96 p.
 1997. — Vol. 5. Lfg. 54. — 96 p.
 1997. — Vol. 5. Lfg. 55. — 96 p.
 1997. — Vol. 5. Lfg. 56. — 96 p.
 1997. — Vol. 5. *bassiare—*birotulare. — 868 p. — 
 1998. — Vol. 6. Lfg. 57. — 96 p.
 1998. — Vol. 6. Lfg. 58. — 96 p.
 1998. — Vol. 6. Lfg. 59. — 96 p.
 1998. — Vol. 6. Lfg. 60. — 96 p.
 1999. — Vol. 6. Lfg. 61. — 96 p.
 1999. — Vol. 6. Lfg. 62. — 96 p.
 1999. — Vol. 6. Lfg. 63. — 96 p.
 1999. — Vol. 6. birrus—brac(c)hiolum. — 864 p. — 
 2000. — Vol. 7. Lfg. 64. — 96 p.
 2000. — Vol. 7. Lfg. 65. — 96 p.
 2000. — Vol. 7. Lfg. 66. — 96 p.
 2001. — Vol. 7. Lfg. 67. — 96 p.
 2001. — Vol. 7. Lfg. 68. — 96 p.
 2001. — Vol. 7. Lfg. 69. — 96 p.
 2001. — Vol. 7. Lfg. 70. — 96 p.
 2002. — Vol. 7. Lfg. 71. — 96 p.
 2002. — Vol. 7. brac(c)hium—bulla. — 800 p. — 
 2002. — Vol. 8. Lfg. 72. — 96 p.
 2003. — Vol. 8. Lfg. 73. — 96 p.
 2003. — Vol. 8. Lfg. 74. — 96 p.
 2004. — Vol. 8. Lfg. 75. — 96 p.
 2004. — Vol. 8. Lfg. 76. — 360 p.
 2004. — Vol. 8. bullare—*bž-, indice. — 1072 p. — 
 2004. — Vol. 9. Lfg. 77. — 96 p.
 2004. — Vol. 9. Lfg. 78. — 96 p.
 2004. — Vol. 9. Lfg. 79. — 96 p.
 2005. — Vol. 9. Lfg. 80. — 96 p.
 2005. — Vol. 9. Lfg. 81. — 96 p.
 2005. — Vol. 9. Lfg. 82. — 96 p.
 2005. — Vol. 9. Lfg. 83. — 96 p.
 2006. — Vol. 9. Lfg. 84. — 96 p.
 2006. — Vol. 9. Lfg. 85. — 124 p.
 2006. — Vol. 9. C—cambiāre. — 900 p. — 
 2006. — Vol. 10. Lfg. 86. — 96 p. — 
 2007. — Vol. 10. Lfg. 87. — 96 p. — 
 2007. — Vol. 10. Lfg. 88. — 96 p. — 
 2007. — Vol. 10. Lfg. 89. — 96 p. — 
 2007. — Vol. 10. Lfg. 90. — 96 p. — 
 2008. — Vol. 10. Lfg. 91. — 96 p. — 
 2008. — Vol. 10. Lfg. 92. — 96 p. — 
 2008. — Vol. 10. Lfg. 93. — 96 p. — 
 2008. — Vol. 10. Lfg. 94. — 96 p. — 
 2008. — Vol. 10. cambiare—capitalis. — 876 p. — 
 2009. — Vol. 11. Lfg. 95. — 96 p. — 
 2009. — Vol. 11. Lfg. 96. — 96 p. — 
 2009. — Vol. 11. Lfg. 97. — 96 p. — 
 2009. — Vol. 11. Lfg. 98. — 96 p. — 
 2009. — Vol. 11. Lfg. 99. — 96 p. — 
 2009. — Vol. 11. Lfg. 100. — 96 p. — 
 2010. — Vol. 11. Lfg. 101. — 96 p. — 
 2010. — Vol. 11. Lfg. 102. — 104 p. — 
 2011. — Vol. 11. capitaneus—*cardare. — 780 p. — 
 2010. — Vol. 12. Lfg. 103. — 96 p. — 
 2010. — Vol. 12. Lfg. 104. — 96 p. — 
 2010. — Vol. 12. Lfg. 105. — 96 p. — 
 2011. — Vol. 12. Lfg. 106. — 96 p. — 
 2011. — Vol. 12. Lfg. 107. — 96 p. — 
 2011. — Vol. 12. Lfg. 108. — 96 p. — 
 2012. — Vol. 12. Lfg. 109. — 96 p. — 
 2012. — Vol. 12. Lfg. 110. — 118 p. — 
 2012. — Vol. 12. *cardeus—katl-. — 792 p. — 
 2012. — Vol. 13. Lfg. 111. — 96 p. — 
 2012. — Vol. 13. Lfg. 112. — 96 p. — 
 2012. — Vol. 13. Lfg. 113. — 96 p. — 
 2013. — Vol. 13. Lfg. 114. — 96 p. — 
 2013. — Vol. 13. Lfg. 115. — 96 p. — 
 2014. — Vol. 13. Lfg. 116. — 96 p. — 
 2014. — Vol. 13. Lfg. 117. — 96 p. — 
 2014. — Vol. 13. Lfg. 118. — 112 p. — 
 2015. — Vol. 13. cat(t)ia—c(h)ordula. — 780 p. — 
 2015. — Vol. 14. Lfg. 119. — 96 p. — 
 2015. — Vol. 14. Lfg. 120. — 96 p. — 
 2016. — Vol. 14. Lfg. 121. — 96 p. — 
 2016. — Vol. 14. Lfg. 122. — 96 p. — 
 2016. — Vol. 14. Lfg. 123. — 96 p. — 
 2016. — Vol. 14. Lfg. 124. — 96 p. — 
 2017. — Vol. 14. Lfg. 125. — 96 p. — 
 2017. — Vol. 14. Lfg. 126. — 96 p. — 
 2017. — Vol. 14. chorus—clepsydra — 768 p. — 
 2017. — Vol. 15. Lfg. 127. — 96 p. — 
 2018. — Vol. 15. Lfg. 128. — 96 p. — 
 2018. — Vol. 15. Lfg. 129. — 96 p. — 
 2018. — Vol. 15. Lfg. 130. — 96 p. — 
 2019. — Vol. 15. Lfg. 131. — 96 p. — 
 2019. — Vol. 15. Lfg. 132. — 96 p. — 
 2019. — Vol. 15. Lfg. 133. — 96 p. — 
 2020. — Vol. 15. Lfg. 134. — 116 p. — 
 2020. — Vol. 15. *clērica—committere. — 792 p., 
 2020. — Vol. 16. Lfg. 135. — 96 p. — 
 2020. — Vol. 16. Lfg. 136. — 96 p. — 
 2021. — Vol. 16. Lfg. 137. — 96 p. — 
 2021. — Vol. 16. Lfg. 138. — 96 p. — 
 2021. — Vol. 16. Lfg. 139. — 96 p. — 
 2021. — Vol. 16. Lfg. 140. — 96 p. — 
 2021. — Vol. 16. Lfg. 141. — 96 p. — 
 2022. — Vol. 16. Lfg. 142. — 96 p. — 
 2022. — Vol. 16. commixtio—conformator. — 768 p., ISBN
 2022. — Vol. 17. Lfg. 143 — 96 p. — 
 ...
 2007. — Lfg. D 1. — 96 p. — 
 2009. — Lfg. D 2. — 96 p. — 
 2010. — Lfg. D 3. — 96 p. — 
 2011. — Lfg. D 4. — 96 p. — 
 2011. — Lfg. D 5. — 96 p. — 
 2012. — Lfg. D 6. — 96 p. — 
 2013. — Lfg. D 7. — 96 p. — 
 2014. — Lfg. D 8. — 112 p. — 
 2016. — Vol. 19. da—detentor. — 740 p. — 
 2014. — Lfg. D 9. — 96 p. — 
 2016. — Lfg. D 10. — 96 p. — 
 2017. — Lfg. D 11. — 96 p. — 
 2021. — Lfg. D 12. — 96 p. — 
 ...
 2011. — Lfg. E 1. — 96 p. — 
 2013. — Lfg. E 2. — 96 p. — 
 2014. — Lfg. E 3. — 96 p. — 
 2016. — Lfg. E 4. — 96 p. — 
 2018. — Lfg. E 5. — 96 p. — 
 2019. — Lfg. E 6. — 96 p. — 
 2021. — Lfg. E 7. — 96 p. — 
 2021. — Lfg. E 8. — 94 p. — 
 2021. — Vol. 21. E—excrescere. — 740 p. —
 2022. — Lfg. E 9. — 96 p. — 
 2022. — Lfg. E 10. — 96 p.
 2022. — Lfg. E 11. — 96 p.
 ...
 2000. — Germanismi Vol. 1, Fasc. 1. — 96 p. — 
 2002. — Germanismi Vol. 1, Fasc. 2. — 96 p. — 
 2003. — Germanismi Vol. 1, Fasc. 3. — 96 p. — 
 2007. — Germanismi Vol. 1, fasc. 4. — 96 p. — 
 2009. — Germanismi Vol. 1, fasc. 5. — 96 p. — 
 2010. — Germanismi Vol. 1, fasc. 6. — 96 p. — 
 2011. — Germanismi Vol. 1, fasc. 7. — 96 p. — 
 2015. — Germanismi Vol. 1, fasc. 8/9. — 164 p. — 
 2016. — Germanismi Vol. 1. Abschied-putzn. — 840 p. — 
 …
 2002. — Supplemento bibliografico. — VI, 395 p. — 
 2012. — Supplemento bibliografico IV. — 448 p. — 
 1992. — Etymologie Und Wortgeschichte Des Italienischen — Genesi E Dimensioni Di Un Vocabolario Etimologico. — 252 p. — 
 2012. — Le nuove frontiere del LEI. — 224 p. —

External links
 Project page 
 LEI online
 Project page at the University of Saarland
 Project page - Akademie der Wissenschaften und der Literatur Mainz

Etymological dictionaries
Italian dictionaries